Hirtodrosophila confusa is a widespread, but rare European species of fruit fly from the family Drosophilidae.

Description

Distribution
Widespread in most of the Palaearctic though rare in northern parts, absent from Great Britain.

Biology
It is mostly associated with woodland habitat types. Specimens have been reared from fungi, which is suspected to the preferred larval food. Populations peak in about July.

References

Drosophilidae
Arthropods of Russia
Taxa named by Rasmus Carl Stæger
Diptera of Europe